The northern lampfish (Stenobrachius leucopsarus), also known as smallfin lanternfish, is a small oceanic fish in the family Myctophidae. First described by husband and wife ichthyologists Carl H. and Rosa Smith Eigenmann in 1890, it is named for the numerous small round photophores that line the ventral surface of its head and body.

A blunt-nosed, relatively large-mouthed fish with small teeth and large eyes, it is gray to dark greenish blue on its dorsal surface and paler ventrally, with black on its fins and operculum. Its large scales rub off easily.

Found in the Pacific Ocean from Japan and Baja California to the Bering Sea, it is the most common species of lanternfish in the northwestern Pacific, and one of the most abundant larval fish in the California Current. Like all lanternfish, this is a deep sea species; it spends the day in the ocean's deeper bathypelagic and mesopelagic zones and ascends to or near the ocean's surface during the night. It is a cool-water fish.

Like most fish, it is oviparous; It feeds on plankton, and is eaten by numerous predators, including fish such as salmon and tuna and birds such as the red-legged kittiwake.

References

Myctophidae
Fish of the Pacific Ocean
Fish described in 1890
Taxa named by Carl H. Eigenmann
Taxa named by Rosa Smith Eigenmann